Family Nature Summits are annual gatherings that offer a mix of environmental and outdoor education and adventure, with notable environmental and wildlife educators providing classes and activities for adults and children. Called "Conservation Summits" until 2000, the National Wildlife Federation (NWF)  held the first Summit (a harbinger of present day ecotourism and green living trends) on July 20–25, 1970, at the YMCA of the Rockies, Rocky Mountain National Park, Colorado. There have been 119 Summits since 1970, with notable environmental educators, naturalists, authors and artists such as Robert Michael Pyle, Jim Halfpenny, Clare Walker Leslie, Roger Tory Peterson, Annie Tiberio Cameron, Steve Torbit, and Craig Tufts  serving as faculty at many of the Summits. The organization's objectives focus on entertaining educational nature programming for youth, teens, and young adults, led by nationally recognized environmental educators such as Steve Houser, recipient of the 2009 Edward C. Roy, Jr. Award For Excellence in K-8 Earth Science Teaching.

Summits have been held in Alaska, California, Michigan, West Virginia, Maine, New York, Colorado, Utah, three Canadian provinces, and elsewhere. In 2006, dozens of longtime Summiteers formed a non-profit corporation to take over the project from NWF.  Family Summits, Inc. has produced Family Nature Summits since then as an independent organization, in Black Mountain, North Carolina in 2007; at Mount Hood, Oregon in 2008; at the YMCA of the Adirondacks in Silver Bay, New York in 2009 ; in the Sierra Nevada near  Tahoe City, California on Lake Tahoe in 2010 and 2017; near Potosi, Missouri at the YMCA of the Ozarks in 2011. In 2012, a Summit was held again at the inaugural Summit site near Rocky Mountain National Park at the YMCA of the Rockies near Estes Park, Colorado, and the following year at Acadia National Park on Mount Desert Island, Maine.  In 2014 one was held at the Asilomar Conference Grounds on California's Monterey Peninsula, the site of Summits from 1973-75 and 1992-93.  In 2015, the Summit was at  Lake Junaluska and the adjacent Great Smoky Mountains National Park.  In 2016, the event was at Ghost Ranch near Abiquiú in northern New Mexico, and in 2018 in the White Mountains of New Hampshire and Maine near Bethel, Maine.  For 2019, the Grand Traverse Bay-Lake Michigan region of northwestern lower Michigan hosted the event.  After 2020-21 coronavirus cancellations, the 2022 event was at the Humboldt State University redwoods area of Northern California.  The July 7-13, 2023 event will be in central Minnesota.

References

Environmental organizations based in the United States